Wellsway School is a mixed comprehensive school on the eastern side of Keynsham, Somerset, England, for students aged 11 to 18. In November 2021, there were 1,266 students attending the school, which is run by Futura Learning Partnership and has been an academy since October 2011.

History
Wellsway School was established in 1971, by amalgamating Keynsham Grammar School and Wellsway County Secondary School, both of which opened on a shared site in the mid-1950s.

Headteachers

House system

The house system has been maintained since the opening of both the Keynsham Grammar School and Wellsway County Secondary School in 1956. The pupils of Wellsway were divided into three Houses, each with their own House Master, Staff and Captains. The three houses were Bridges House, Chandos House and Rodney House. The house system as it is today was created when Wellsway School opened in 1971. The four houses are named after local villages; Burnett, Compton, Newton and Stanton. These are then represented by colours: purple for Burnett, blue for Compton, orange for Newton and red for Stanton.

Structural changes
The school has gone through many changes since its opening in 1956. Many of these are new builds, or extensions, with the original buildings still standing and fully functional.

Key structural changes through the years have been:

Minor structural changes:

Statistics
Most students that attend the school live in Keynsham and Saltford or the nearby villages.

Campus
Wellsway School is on the eastern side of Keynsham in a spacious campus with open and green fields. The campus has three areas: Lansdown Building, Mendip Building and the playing fields. A review of schools within Bath and North East Somerset during 2010 identified some buildings which were in poor condition and proposed expanding Wellsway and closing Broadlands School to create a single school in Keynsham, though a decision was made not to proceed with this proposal.

Uniform

Wellsway requires students to wear uniform consisting of green blazers and colour-coded house ties. Uniform is worn by all pupils except sixth-form students.

Curriculum teams and subjects
In 2005/2006, the staff structure was reviewed at Wellsway, resulting in the departmental structure being revised. From September 2006, the previous structure was replaced by curriculum teams, which in some cases, comprises more than one subject team.

In 2016  the structure was as follows:

Initiatives

Sports & Science Centre of Excellence

Wellsway's bid for specialist school status was accepted in September 2007, giving it Sports and Science College status.  A joint bid was unusual as there were only six schools in the country with a combined Sports and Science specialism. This status provided additional funding of £129 per student per year to spend on teaching and learning. The specialist schools programme ended in 2020.

Playing for Success

Wellsway School is part of the Playing for Success scheme run by the Department for Children, Schools and Families. Wellsway School takes part in the initiative that takes place at the Bath Rec. This support centre is a 'classroom within a club' which offers after school study support to pupils in Year 8–9.

Fairtrade status

On 29 March 2007, the school was the first school in the district to be awarded Fair Trade status. Fair Trade coffee, tea and sugar are used in the staff room and other products sold in the school canteen, in Shades, the Sixth Form cafe, and in a weekly tuck shop run by students. Fair Trade issues are integrated in the curriculum and taught in subjects such as Business Studies, Citizenship, Geography and Religious Studies.

Wellsway Sixth Form College

Many sixth form students go on to university. In 2006, the Sixth Form had 280 students aged between 16 and 19, having the choice to study from a range of 25 subjects at AS/A2 level. The students can also take part in a range of extracurricular opportunities, such as Teacher Support sessions, team building exercises, tutorials and theatre trips. A new sixth form learning centre which hosts a computer suite, private study and office area was opened in October 2008.

Sport
Students represent the district, county or region in various sports. Sporting success has been achieved in many sports including cricket, football, rugby union, athletics, netball and especially field hockey. A new artificial turf pitch was constructed in 2005.

Since the opening of the artificial pitch, Wellsway has played XI Mixed Hockey against local schools and in the 2006–2007 season, won the U18 Mixed District Tournament. Players from the school have gone on to play at club level in the area and around the country.

In netball, the U14 team reached the National Championships in Bournemouth and teams for other age groups have been district and regional champions.

Wellsway also supports students who want to pursue a career in Sport, including the RFU Referee's foundation course.

Futura Learning Partnership
Wellsway Multi Academy Trust (MAT) was formed in 2014 and at first comprised six academy schools. The trust expanded significantly and constructed two studio schools, one in Bath and one on the Wellsway site.

The trust also sponsors the Sir Bernard Lovell Academy after its inadequate 2014 Ofsted report.

In 2018 Ofsted found that all the secondary schools other than Wellsway School in the MAT required improvement. The MAT noted that Sir Bernard Lovell Academy had come out of special measures, and the other two schools were first inspections. In 2018, the MAT proposed that Bath Studio School should close in 2020, largely because only 126 places of the school's 300 capacity were in use so the school was being heavily subsidised by the MAT.

The organisation's name was changed in June 2021 from Wellsway Multi Academy Trust to Futura Learning Partnership, reflecting its growth to 13 academies.

Academies

The MAT also operates three "Aspire AP" sites offering provision for about 30 children with serious mental health, behavioural and emotional problems.

References

External links
 
 Wellsway Multi-academy Trust

Educational institutions established in 1971
Fair trade schools
Academies in Bath and North East Somerset
Keynsham
1971 establishments in England
Secondary schools in Bath and North East Somerset